The Standing Stones of Stenness is a Neolithic monument five miles northeast of Stromness on the mainland of Orkney, Scotland. This may be the oldest henge site in the British Isles. Various traditions associated with the stones survived into the modern era and they form part of the Heart of Neolithic Orkney World Heritage Site. They are looked after by Historic Environment Scotland as a scheduled monument.

Layout and location
The surviving stones are sited on a promontory at the south bank of the stream that joins the southern ends of the sea loch Loch of Stenness and the freshwater Loch of Harray. The name, which is pronounced stane-is in Orcadian dialect, comes from Old Norse meaning stone headland.

Although the site today lacks the encircling ditch and bank, excavation has shown this site was a henge monument, possibly the oldest in the British Isles. The entrance faces towards the Neolithic Barnhouse Settlement which has been found adjacent to the Loch of Harray. Once there were at least two stones there, as in the 1930s the stump of a second stone was found. Other smaller stones include a square stone setting in the centre of the circle platform where cremated bone, charcoal and pottery were found. This is referred to as a "hearth", similar to the one found at Barnhouse. Animal bones were found in the ditch. The pottery links the monument to Skara Brae and Maeshowe. Based on radiocarbon dating, it is thought that work on the site had begun by 3100 BC.

Traditions and history

Even in the 18th century the site was still associated with traditions and rituals, by then relating to Norse gods. It was visited by Walter Scott in 1814. Other antiquarians documented the stones and recorded local traditions and beliefs about them. One stone, known as the "Odin Stone" which stood in the field to the north of the henge, was pierced with a circular hole, and was used by local couples for plighting engagements by holding hands through the gap. It was also associated with other ceremonies and believed to have magical power.  There was a reported tradition of making all kinds of oaths or promises with one's hand in the Odin Stone; this was known as taking the "Vow of Odin".

In December 1814 Captain W. Mackay, a recent immigrant to Orkney who owned farmland in the vicinity of the stones, decided to remove them on the grounds that local people were trespassing and disturbing his land by using the stones in rituals. He started in December 1814 by smashing the Odin Stone. This caused outrage and he was stopped after destroying one other stone and toppling another.

The toppled stone was re-erected in 1906 along with some inaccurate reconstruction inside the circle.

In the 1970s, a dolmen structure was toppled, since there were doubts as to its authenticity. The two upright stones remain in place.

A picture of the Stones of Stenness features on the cover of Van Morrison's album The Philosopher's Stone, and the Odin stone is depicted on Julian Cope's album Discover Odin. The stones are also the setting for the Loreena McKennitt song "Standing Stones" from her album Parallel Dreams, concerning a pair of star-crossed lovers who meet at the Odin stone, only for the man to meet a tragic fate.

World Heritage status
The Heart of Neolithic Orkney was inscribed as a World Heritage site in December 1999. In addition to the Standing Stones of Stenness, the site includes Maeshowe, Skara Brae, the Ring of Brodgar and other nearby sites. It is managed by Historic Environment Scotland, whose 'Statement of Significance' for the site begins:
The monuments at the heart of Neolithic Orkney and Skara Brae proclaim the triumphs of the human spirit in early ages and isolated places. They were approximately contemporary with the mastabas of the archaic period of Egypt (first and second dynasties), the brick temples of Sumeria, and the first cities of the Harappa culture in India, and a century or two earlier than the Golden Age of China. Unusually fine for their early date, and with a remarkably rich survival of evidence, these sites stand as a visible symbol of the achievements of early peoples away from the traditional centres of civilisation...Stenness is a unique and early expression of the ritual customs of the people who buried their dead in tombs like Maes Howe and lived in settlements like Skara Brae.

References

Bibliography
 
 Scotland Before History - Stuart Piggott, Edinburgh University Press 1982, 
 Scotland's Hidden History - Ian Armit, Tempus (in association with Historic Scotland) 1998, 
 Guide to Prehistoric Scotland - Richard Feachem, B.T. Batsford Ltd. 1977, 
 Scotland, Archaeology and Early History - Graham and Anna Ritchie, Edinburgh University Press 1997, 
 Building the great stone circles of the north - Colin Richards, Windgather Press 2013 
 The Stones of Stenness, Orkney - J N Graham Ritchie, available as pdf here (download requires acceptance of terms)

External links

4th-millennium BC architecture in Scotland
Archaeological sites in Orkney
Prehistoric Orkney
Scheduled Ancient Monuments in Orkney
Stone Age sites in Scotland
World Heritage Sites in Scotland
Megalithic monuments in Scotland
Historic Scotland properties in Orkney
Neolithic Scotland
Stone circles in Orkney
Mainland, Orkney
Heart of Neolithic Orkney